Der Hamburger und Germania Ruder Club (DHuGRC) is a rowing club from Rotherbaum, Hamburg, Germany.  It was founded in 1836 as Der Hamburger Ruder Club, the club is the fourth oldest rowing club in the world (2nd if only counting non-academically affiliated clubs) after Brasenose College Boat Club, Jesus College Boat Club (Oxford) and Leander Club . The Germania Ruder Club, which was founded in 1854 merged with Der Hamburger Ruder Club in 1934, with the joint club adapting the current name. 

The current boathouse at Außenalster was opened in 2016.

Notable Rowers
Bastian Seibt from this club represented Germany at the 2008 Summer Olympics in Beijing, China.

References

External links
 Official website including information in English

Sports clubs established in 1934
Sport in Hamburg
Rowing clubs in Germany
1934 establishments in Germany